Bransby Lewis Key (1838–1901) was the 2nd bishop of St John's in what was then known as Kaffraria and is now Mthatha, South Africa. Born into a medical family he was educated at Kensington Grammar School and St Augustine's College, Canterbury. Ordained deacon in  1864 and priest a year later, his first post was as a missionary in the Transkei. After 19 years he was appointed coadjutor bishop of the diocese, and four years later (when Bishop Callaway retired) took full control of the see.

Bransby Lewis Key married Georgina Annie Waters (daughter of Rev. H. J. Waters) in October 1868 at St John's Mission Station. They had seven children:
Annie Katherine Key born on 29 August 1869, died 5 September 1869;
Alice Mary Key born 15 April 1871, married William Allerton Goodwin on 3 July 1890, St John's Cathedral;
Henry Aston Key born 8 July 1873, married Marguerite Isabel Hickman on 1 September 1904, St Peter's Cathedral;
Mina Julia Key born on 6 October 1875, married Caleb George Warner Atkinson on 19 June 1900, St Johns Cathedral;
Edmund Bransby Key born on 11 May 1878;
Evelyn Margaret Key - date of birth unknown;
Ellen Georgina Key - date of birth unknown.

Notes

Further reading
Callaway, Godfrey (1912) A Shepherd of the Veld: Bransby Lewis Key, bishop of St. John's Kaffraria. London: W. Gardner, Darton

1838 births
Anglican bishops of St John's
19th-century Anglican bishops in Africa
1901 deaths
Alumni of St Augustine's College, Canterbury